Toine Hermsen is a restaurant located in Maastricht in the Netherlands. It is a fine dining restaurant that was awarded one or two Michelin stars from 1993 to present. GaultMillau awarded the restaurant 16.0 out of 20 points.

Toine Hermsen is a member of Les Patrons Cuisiniers.

Star History
- 1993-1997: one star
- 1998-2001: two stars
- 2002–2015: one star

See also
List of Michelin starred restaurants in the Netherlands

Sources and references 

Restaurants in Maastricht
Restaurants in the Netherlands
Michelin Guide starred restaurants in the Netherlands